Lucidity: The Web Saga is a metaphysical comedy web series produced by Third Productions. The program was created and written by Sean Oliver and Danny Torgersen, who co-star as George (Torgersen) and Jason (Oliver). In addition to screening at the 2013 Phoenix Comicon, Lucidity was an Official Selection at the L.A. Web Series Festival in 2011, 2012, and 2013 Winning The Saga multiple awards in Directing, Editing, Composition, and Special Effects

Synopsis
Lucidity takes place in the astral dream world. The series begins with two roommates, George and Jason, who for reasons unknown share each other's dreams. The two have no control over their dreams and as the astral world increasingly encroaches on their real lives they decide to take action. This decision sends the roommates on an out-of-body adventure that neither of them were prepared for.

Episodes

Cast and Producers

Cast
Jason - Sean Oliver

George - Danny Torgersen

Bill - Bill

Dream Girl/Melody/Siren 1/Lady Vamp 3 - Cassidy Hilgers

Ricky - Keenan James

Arnold - Drew Leatham

Chris - John Knott

Miss K - Kandyce Hughes

Lucid Hunter - Matt Bartos

The Wizard - Zach Hilgers

Producers
Simon Navarro Keenan James Drew Leatham Jason McClellan Cody Hunt Sean Oliver Danny Torgersen

Original Lucidity Soundtrack
The music for Lucidity is written and recorded by Danny Torgersen and Captain Squeegee. When asked about the music making process in an interview with Shawnnah Chaney from the ASU State Press, Torgersen is quoted, "Well, as we write the episode there’s often an indescribable cluster of melodies that begin to form in my brain. I call this part my brain recording...Typically if the musical ideas are any good I remember what it’s supposed to sound like and then desperately try to recreate it on my old crappy computer...After recording I actually work with John Knott, also our sound producer, who mixes and masters and does all those things I’ll never understand."

Involvement in Lucid Dreaming Community
One of the main themes of the show is lucid dreaming and the real life questions that surround the subject. Creator Sean Oliver presented dream research regarding dream-to-dream communication via the internet at the 29th Annual International Association For The Study of Dreams Conference. In addition Lucidity has been featured in The Lucid Dream Exchange, as well as the "Get Lucid" podcast based out of the U.K. Gaining the attention of authors such as Robert Waggoner (wrote Lucid Dreaming: Gateway to the Inner Self) who responds to the fourth episode of Lucidity with, "For a zero-based-budget film company with volunteer cast and crew shooting, you guys deserve a lucid Emmy -- or LEmmy for Episode IV." 

Creator Sean Oliver is quoted, "The dream is still a mystery. People live their lives thinking that we understand it, but the truth is we don’t, we ignore it. If we can’t accurately comprehend the dream state then perhaps some of our assumptions about normal consciousness are misguided as well. I think we should all explore that."

References

American comedy web series